Phidippus princeps pulcherrimus is a subspecies of spider in the Salticidae (jumping spider) family. It belongs to the species Phidippus princeps and is found in the United States.

References

Salticidae
Spiders of the United States
Spiders described in 1885